Cardona, officially the Municipality of Cardona,  is a 3rd class municipality in the province of Rizal, Philippines. According to the 2020 census, it has a population of 50,143 people.

Cardona is part of the 2nd Congressional District of Rizal.

With the continuous expansion of Metro Manila, the municipality is now part of Manila's conurbation which reaches Cardona in its easternmost part.

In 1855, Cardona was created as a town of the District of Morong, with boundaries set in 1857. Later in June 1901, Cardona formed part of the newly created Province of Rizal through Act 137 promulgated by the Philippine Commission. In 1903, Act 942 annexed the town to the Municipality of Morong. Eleven years then, the Executive Order 108 issued by Governor-General Francis Burton Harrison has established the town as an independent municipality.

Etymology
An oral folklore tells how the name “Cardona” was derived from the Spanish word “caldo” referring to a native rice broth. Supposedly, a stranger walking through the street of the town happened to ask the name of the town from a native, who at that time was enjoying a bowl of hot “caldo”. Thinking that the stranger was inquiring as to what he was eating, the native answered “Sapao! Caldo!”

Another story tells that the town of Cardona in the Province of Barcelona, Spain is believed to be the eponym of the town.  Settlements in the area during the Spanish-era were on the hills and the place surrounded by waters of the Laguna Lake. Early missionary Franciscan friars have seen its resemblance to the Spanish town which is also located on a hill and is almost surrounded by the waters of the river Cardener. Parts of the present-day Barangays Calahan, Patunhay, Del Remedio, Iglesia, San Roque, Dalig, and Looc are set on these hills.

Geography

Barangays
Cardona is politically subdivided into 18 barangays, 11 of which are on the mainland and 7 on Talim Island.

Mainland
 Calahan
 Dalig
 Del Remedio
 Iglesia
 Looc
 Nagsulo
 Patunhay
 Real (Poblacion)
 Sampad
 San Roque (Poblacion)
 Ticulio

Talim Island
 Balibago
 Boor
 Lambac
 Malanggam-Calubacan
 Navotas
 Subay
 Tuna

Climate

Demographics

Religion

Christianity is the major religion in the town, and the majority of all Christian denomination is Catholicism where 82% of its inhabitants are baptized Roman Catholics. The town has a minority of UNACAED members, Iglesia ni Cristo, Born Again sects, Jehovah's Witnesses and more.

The town is also the home of the famed and miraculous image of Nuestra Señora del Santísimo Rosario — La Virgen de Sapao, which was granted the honor of Pontifical Coronation by His Holiness Pope Francis, through his representative José Fuerte Cardinal Advíncula, the Archbishop of Manila, on 7 October 2022.

Catholic Churches 
 Diocesan Shrine and Parish of Our Lady of the Holy Rosary
 Our Lady of Lourdes Parish

Protestant Denominations 
 Cardona Bethel United Methodist Church
 Cardona Church of Christ
 Cardona Christian Church
 Dae Heung Presbyterian Church
 United Christian Baptist Church
 Cardona Baptist Church

Religious Sects 
 Different Born Again sects
Iglesia Ni Cristo
Jehovah's Witnesses (church defunct)
Jesus is Lord
Members Church of God International - Ang Dating Daan
Unión de Adoradores Cristianos Al Espiritu Divino Inc. (UNACAED)
Samahan ng Mananampalataya sa Espiritu ng Kadiyosan - Tres Picos

Economy

Education

State-run Institutions

Private Schools
Castle for Achievers Learning School
CJ Learning Center
Lyceum Internation of the Far East (permanently closed)
Mother Most Chaste School
MV Montessori School
Queen Mary Help of Christians Educational Center
San Francisco Parish School
Talim Island Academy Foundation

Healthcare

Public Health Setvices
Rural Health Unit (RHU) - Health Services are offered at the Municipal Facility, and Health Services Centers in individual Barangays. Cardona RHU is headed by Dra. Eloida Silao M.D.

Private Hospitals
Queen Mary Help of Christians Hospital (Calahan)
Carlos Medical and Maternity Hospital (Looc)

References

External links

 
 Cardona Profile at PhilAtlas.com
 [ Philippine Standard Geographic Code]
 Philippine Census Information
 Local Governance Performance Management System

Municipalities of Rizal
Populated places on Laguna de Bay